"Lovin' Each Day" is the fourth and final single released from Irish singer-songwriter Ronan Keating's debut solo album, Ronan (2000). The song was written by Gregg Alexander and Rick Nowels and was included only on the re-release of the album before appearing on Keating's second album, Destination (2002). The single was released on 9 April 2001 in Australia and on 16 April in Ireland and the United Kingdom.

Commercially, "Lovin' Each Day" peaked at number one in Scotland,  number two on the UK Singles Chart, and entered the top 10 in Canada, Denmark, Ireland, Italy, New Zealand, and Portugal. It was Keating's first song to appear on a US Billboard chart, peaking at number 32 on the Adult Top 40. Sales of the song increased when it was used as the theme for Sky Sports' Ford Super Sunday coverage in 2001, and the song soon received a silver certification from the British Phonographic Industry (BPI) for shipping over 200,000 copies.

Track listings

UK CD1
 "Lovin' Each Day"
 "Starlight"
 Interview with Ronan part 1

UK CD2
 "Lovin' Each Day"
 "Somedays"
 Interview with Ronan part 2

UK cassette single
 "Lovin' Each Day"
 "Lovin' Each Day" (Almighty mix)

European CD single
 "Lovin' Each Day"
 "Starlight"

Australian CD1
 "Lovin' Each Day"
 "Starlight"
 "Feel"
 "The Way You Make Me Feel"  (CD-ROM video)

Australian CD2
 "Lovin' Each Day"
 "Somedays"
 "Even If I'm Gone"

US CD single
 "Lovin' Each Day" – 3:32
 "When You Say Nothing at All" – 4:18

Credits and personnel
Credits are adapted from the UK CD1 liner notes.

Studios
 Recorded at Soul II Soul Studios and PWL Studios (London, England)
 Mixed at Larrabee Studios (Hollywood, California, US)
 Mastered at Gateway Mastering (Portland, Maine, US)

Personnel

 Gregg Alexander – writing, production
 Rick Nowels – writing, backing vocals, piano, keyboards, production
 Ronan Keating – vocals
 Danielle Brisebois, Sue Ann Carwell, Alex Brown, Alfie Silas – backing vocals
 Rusty Anderson – guitars
 John Pierce – bass
 Wayne Rodrigues – drums

 Charles Judge – piano, keyboards
 Dave Way – mixing
 Bob Ludwig – mastering
 Ed Colman, Moe El-Khamlichi, Chris Brown, Randy Wine – engineering
 Louis Walsh, Mark Plunkett – management
 Frost Design – artwork design
 Bernhard Kühmstedt – photography

Charts and certifications

Weekly charts

Year-end charts

Certifications

Release history

References

2000 songs
2001 singles
A&M Records singles
Number-one singles in Scotland
Polydor Records singles
Ronan Keating songs
Song recordings produced by Gregg Alexander
Songs written by Gregg Alexander
Songs written by Rick Nowels